The Tyers Valley tramway was a  narrow-gauge timber tramway built by the Forests Commission of Victoria to exploit timber resources on the slopes of Mount Baw Baw, Victoria. At Collins Siding the tramway linked with the Victorian Railways' narrow-gauge line from Moe to Walhalla, and was built to the same  gauge.

Sawmills in the forests of Victoria were usually connected to a railway by a privately owned tramway.  Many of these tramways were constructed to very rudimentary standards, such as using timber rails and horses for motive power.  The private tramways serving the Tyers Valley were largely destroyed by bushfires in 1926. Rather than rebuild the private tramways, the Forests Commission, the state-government body created to manage forest resources, decided to construct a higher-quality tramway to serve all private sawmills in the district.

The tramway used second-hand  rails from Tasmania. No ballast was used, but greater use was made of sleepers than was normal.

A geared locomotive was constructed by the Port Melbourne firm of Alfred Harmon in 1927. This locomotive, which had been purchased under requirements to support local industry, was too heavy and only ran once before being parked.  Permission was given to import a Climax steam locomotive from the United States.  The 25-ton class B locomotive was the last Climax locomotive ever manufactured, and the only one built for a  gauge railway.

The tramway route extended  from Collins Siding to Tyers Junction, where the line divided to follow two of the three branches of the Tyers River.  Normal operation was for timber to be moved from sawmills to Tyers Junction behind TALC rail tractors.  At Tyers Junction the timber was consolidated into trains which were then hauled upgrade to Collins Siding by the Climax.

The tramway closed in 1949, and the Climax locomotive was moved to the Government sawmill at Erica.  It was subsequently preserved on the Puffing Billy Railway, along with one of the TALC tractors.

Most of the tramway route has been opened as a rail trail.

See also 
 Bicycle Trails in Victoria

References

Other reading 
 The Tyers Valley Tramway, Wadeson, N.E. Australian Railway Historical Society Bulletin, January 1959 pp1–7

External links 
Tyers Valley tramway information
Rail trail information

2 ft 6 in gauge railways in Australia
Railway lines in Victoria (Australia)
Rail trails in Victoria (Australia)
Logging railways in Australia
Transport in Gippsland (region)